Phang Siew Moi is the founding director of Institute of Ocean & Earth Science and a full professor at the Institute of Biological Sciences, Faculty of Science, University of Malaya. She is a leading expert in algal biotechnology and utilisation, particularly converting algae into biodiesel.

References

Academic staff of the University of Malaya
Biotechnologists
Women biotechnologists
Living people
Year of birth missing (living people)
Place of birth missing (living people)